was a Japanese daimyō of Tōdō clan from the Azuchi–Momoyama to Edo periods. He rose from relatively humble origins as an ashigaru (a light foot soldier) to become a daimyō.

Biography
 

During his lifetime he changed his feudal master seven times and worked for ten people, but in the end he rendered loyalty to Tokugawa Ieyasu, who became his last master. 

Takatora started working for Azai Nagamasa at the age of 15. In 1576, he served Hashiba Hidenaga, the younger brother of Hashiba Hideyoshi, a senior vassal of Nobunaga, and was granted a smallholding of land. 

Tōdō Takatora was promoted rapidly under Hashiba Hidenaga. In 1581, after Takatora defeated a local clan in Tajima Province, his holding was increased and he was made commander of a unit of musketeers.  
He fought in the Chugoku region and fought at the Battle of Shizugatake in 1583.  

In 1585, he served in the conquest of Kishū and defeated Yukawa Naoharu. He was given more land in Kii Province, and was appointed 'commissioner' for the construction of Saruokayama Castle and Wakayama Castle. These were Takatora’s first castles. In the same year, he made contribution in the Invasion of Shikoku, and was awarded further land by Hideyoshi, becoming a daimyo in his own right.

In 1591, after Hidenaga died, Takatora serve under Hideyoshi, he participated in the invasions of Korea as a "Fleet Commander" of Toyotomi's navy. His fiefdom at that time was Iyo-Uwajima.  During the Edo period, the wealth of each fiefdom was measured as a volume of rice production in koku.  Iyo-Uwajima was assessed at 70,000 koku.

Tōdō Takatora is also famous for excellence in castle design. He is said to have been involved in building as many as twenty castles, including Edo Castle, Wakayama Castle, Uwajima Castle, Imabari Castle, Iga Ueno Castle and Sasayama Castle.

Battle of Sekigahara

In 1600, at the Battle of Sekigahara, although he was one of Toyotomi's main generals, he sided with Tokugawa Ieyasu. During the battle, 'Eastern' troops under Takatora command, nearly lost against 
Ōtani Yoshitsugu 'Western' army. However, when Kobayakawa Hideaki army charged down attacking Yoshitsugu's from the west, Yoshitsugu lost his ground and is said to have committed suicide, later the Eastern army won the battle.

The Ietada Nikki records; Shima Sakon fourth son, Shima Kiyomasa within Yoshitsugu's ranks, tried to kill Takatora in one blow, however he was struck down and killed by an 'Eastern' general named Takagi Heizaburō. 

After the war he was given a larger fiefdom, Iyo-Imabari, assessed at 200,000 koku. Later in life he was made lord of Tsu (with landholdings in Iga and Ise), a domain of 320,000 koku.

Popular culture

Films
 Portrayed by Kim Myung-gon in the 2014 film The Admiral: Roaring Currents.

Comics
A fictionalized version of Todo (renamed "Todo Tokotora") appears in the 2009 comic miniseries Yi Soon Shin: Warrior and Defender, where he is shown in a lover's relationship with fellow general Gurijima Michiyuki. Gurijima's death during the Battle of Hansando becomes Todo's primary motivation to eliminate Yi.

Video games
Takatora is a playable character in the Samurai Warriors franchise debuting in Sengoku Musou Chronicle 2nd. In Samurai Warriors 4, he is portrayed as an Azai retainer and a close friend of Ōtani Yoshitsugu before joining the Toyotomi.

Further reading

References 

Tōdō family information (25 Sept. 2007)

External links
Momoyama, Japanese Art in the Age of Grandeur, an exhibition catalog from The Metropolitan Museum of Art (fully available online as PDF), which contains material on Tōdō Takatora

|-

Takatora, Todo
Takatora, Todo
Toda Takatora
Toda Takatora
17th-century military history of Japan
People from Shiga Prefecture